= Ammonium hexafluorostannate =

Names
- IUPAC name Ammonium hexafluorostannate
- Other names Ammonium tin fluoride, ammonium hexafluorostannate(IV)

Identifiers
CAS Number	16919-24-7
3D model (JSmol)	Interactive image
ChemSpider	10738918
- InChI: InChI=1S/6FH.2H3N.Sn/h6*1H;2*1H3;/q;;;;;;;;+4/p-4 Key: UWWCEQYTGCAXHS-UHFFFAOYSA-J
- SMILES: [NH4+].[NH4+].F[Sn--](F)(F)(F)(F)F

Properties
Chemical formula	F_{6}H_{8}N_{2}Sn
Molar mass	268.778 g·mol^{−1}
Appearance	white crystalline solid
Solubility in water	soluble

Hazards
- GHS labelling
Pictograms	(GHS07: Exclamation mark)
Signal word	Warning
Hazard statements	H315, H319, H335
- Except where otherwise noted, data are given for materials in their standard state (at 25 °C [77 °F], 100 kPa). Infobox references

Ammonium hexafluorostannate is an inorganic chemical compound with the chemical formula (NH_{4})_{2}SnF_{6}.

== Physical properties ==
Ammonium hexafluorostannate typically appears as a white crystalline solid. The compound is soluble in water and insoluble in organic solvents.

== Uses ==
Ammonium hexafluorostannate is a source of tin in various chemical synthesis processes, facilitating production of tin-containing compounds and materials.
